Jay Williams may refer to:
J. Williams (singer) (born 1986), New Zealand R&B singer
Jay Williams (basketball) (born 1981), also known as Jason Williams, professional basketball player
Jay Williams (American football) (born 1971), professional football player
Jay Williams (author) (1914–1978), author of children's books
Jay Williams (politician) (born 1971), mayor of Youngstown, Ohio
Jay Williams (musician) (born 1973), mainly linked with RPM, Love City Groove now works in property
Jay Williams (actor), Canadian actor, see List of Stargate SG-1 characters
Jay Williams (Medal of Honor) (1872–1938), American Medal of Honor recipient
Jay Williams (guitarist/composer), British musician 
Jay Williams (footballer) (born 2000), English footballer for Harrogate Town

See also
Jason Williams (disambiguation)